Bala Turkvision Song Contest, also known as Bala Türkvizyon Song Contest in English, was an annual song contest, inspired by the format of the Junior Eurovision Song Contest. The contest was open to countries and regions which are Turkic-speaking and of Turkic ethnicity, and songs had to be in the respective country's national language.

Format
Bala Turkvision was based on the format of the Junior Eurovision Song Contest. It focused primarily on participating Turkic countries and regions. A juror from each nation awarded between 1 and 10 points for every entry, except their own. In the final, a jury determined the winner. Unlike the Junior Eurovision where the winning country typically hosts the following year's event, hosting of the Bala Turkvision Song Contest took place in the country or region that was also hosting the Turkish Capital of Culture.

History
It was announced on 7 June 2015, that the inaugural Bala Turkvision Song Contest would be held in Mary, Turkmenistan, though it was later confirmed that the competition had been moved to Istanbul, Turkey. The event took place on 15 December 2015 and included entries from 13 nations. The first edition was won by Azerbaijan with "Cocukluk Yillari". On 18 April 2016, the second Bala Turkvision Song Contest was again announced to take place in Turkey. Eleven countries and regions had announced their participation, with Crimea, Kumyk, Sandžak, Stavropol Krai, and Yakutia, planning on making their debuts. On 8 December 2016, it was announced that both the Turkvision Song Contest 2016 and Bala Turkvision Song Contest 2016 had been delayed until March 2017. The reason for the cancelation was later confirmed to be due to the December 2016 Istanbul bombings. Instead it was announced in February 2017 by the Ministry of Culture and Sports in Kazakhstan, that a 2017 edition would take place in Astana, Kazakhstan, and would coincide with other events taking place in the city as part of Expo 2017. The contest was to be held at the Barys Arena. Only five Turkic regions, which have either a large Turkic population or a widely spoken Turkic language, confirmed their participation in the contest before it too was cancelled on 20 October 2017.

Participation
The following table lists countries or regions involved in the contest. Shaded rows indicate participants who took part in the first edition, but opted to not return in subsequent years, preceding the contest's outright cancelation.

Winners

By contest

By country/region
The table below shows the top-three placings from each contest, along with the years that a country won the contest.

Hosting

Notes

References

 
Song contests
Festivals established in 2015
2015 establishments in Turkmenistan
Youth music competitions